Benevola is a small farming community in Pickens County, Alabama, United States. It is located along the Sipsey River.

Geography

References

Unincorporated communities in Alabama
Unincorporated communities in Pickens County, Alabama